Niyazoba (also, Mikhailovka, Mikhaylovka, and Nizovaya) is a village and municipality in the Khachmaz Rayon of Azerbaijan.  It has a population of 1,352.

References 

Populated places in Khachmaz District